The Los Angeles Rams, a professional American football team based in Los Angeles, joined the National Football League (NFL) as the Cleveland Rams in 1937. The Rams began playing in 1936 as a charter member of the second American Football League. Although the NFL granted membership to the same owner, the NFL considers it a separate entity. In 1946, Rams' owner Dan Reeves, fed up with poor attendance at Cleveland Stadium, moved the Rams to Los Angeles, and the team played there from 1946 to 1979. Before his death in 1979, later Rams owner Carroll Rosenbloom planned a move within the Los Angeles metropolitan area to Anaheim, using the venue now known as Angel Stadium, and his widow and successor Georgia Frontiere went through with the move in 1980, with the team still officially representing Los Angeles. The Rams moved to St. Louis in 1995 and renamed the team St. Louis Rams. In January 2016, the Rams and the NFL announced that the team would return to Los Angeles. The team initially played at its original L.A. venue, the Los Angeles Memorial Coliseum from 2016-2019, while awaiting the 2020 opening of its new stadium in suburban Inglewood.

The Rams first participated in the 1938 NFL Annual Player Selection Meeting, more commonly known as the NFL Draft. The Rams did have a 1937 pick, but it was picked by the NFL for an expansion team and later the Rams were later admitted into the league before the 1937 season. Every year during April, each NFL franchise seeks to add new players to its roster through the NFL Draft. Teams are ranked in inverse order based on the previous season's record, with the worst record picking first, and the second–worst picking second and so on. The two exceptions to this order are made for teams that appeared in the previous Super Bowl; the Super Bowl champion always picks 32nd, and the Super Bowl loser always picks 31st. Teams have the option of trading away their picks to other teams for different picks, players, cash, or a combination thereof. Thus, it is not uncommon for a team's actual draft pick to differ from their assigned draft pick, or for a team to have extra or no draft picks in any round due to these trades.

The Rams' first selection as an NFL team was Johnny Drake, a fullback from Purdue in 1937. The Rams have selected the number one overall six times, drafting Corbett Davis in 1938, Billy Cannon in 1960, Terry Baker in 1963, Orlando Pace in 1997, Sam Bradford in 2010, and Jared Goff in 2016.  The Rams have drafted second overall seven times and the third overall two times. Five eventual Hall of Famers were selected by the Rams: Elroy "Crazylegs" Hirsch, Merlin Olsen, Tom Mack, Jack Youngblood, and Eric Dickerson. The team's most recent first round selections are Greg Robinson, an offensive tackle from Auburn,  Aaron Donald, a defensive tackle from Pittsburgh, Todd Gurley, a running back from Georgia, and Jared Goff, a quarterback from California.

Key

Player selection

Notes
 The Rams traded their 1948 pick to Detroit Lions.
 The Rams received the 1950 pick (9th overall) from Chicago Cardinals.
 The Rams received the 1953 pick (9th overall) from Philadelphia Eagles.
 The Rams received the 1956 pick (6th overall) from New York Giants.
 The Rams received the 1957 pick (11th overall) from New York Giants.
 The Rams received the 1958 pick (4th overall) from Washington Redskins.
 The Rams received the 1959 pick (2nd overall) from Philadelphia Eagles.
 The Rams received the 1962 pick (2nd overall) from Minnesota Vikings.
 The Rams received the 1963 pick (10th overall) from Chicago Bears.
 The Rams traded their 1967 pick to Minnesota Vikings.
 The Rams traded their 1968 pick to Detroit Lions.
 The Rams received the 1969 pick (8th overall) from Detroit Lions.
 The Rams received the 1969 pick (10th overall) from Washington Redskins.
 The Rams received the 1971 pick (10th overall) Washington Redskins.
 The Rams traded their 1972 pick to New England Patriots.
 The Rams traded Rick Cash and the 1973 first-round pick (11th overall) to New England Patriots for Fred Dryer.
 The Rams traded Roman Gabriel to Philadelphia Eagles for Eagles' 1974 first-round pick and 1975 first and third-round picks. The Rams traded their own 1974 pick to Baltimore Colts.
 The Rams received the 1975 pick (9th overall) from Green Bay Packers.
 The Rams traded their 1984 pick to Kansas City Chiefs.
 The Rams traded their 1987 pick (20th overall) to the Houston Oilers.
 The Rams traded the 1988 first-round pick (14th overall) to Detroit Lions, and received the 1988 pick (3rd overall) from Indianapolis Colts.
 The Rams received the 1996 pick (6th overall) to Washington Redskins.
 The Rams traded Trent Green, and 2001 fourth-round pick (150th overall) to Kansas City Chiefs for the Chiefs' 2001 first-round pick (12th overall) on April 20, 2001.
 The Rams traded Kevin Carter to Tennessee Titans for the Titans' 2001 first-round pick (29th overall) on March 29, 2001.
 The Rams traded their first-round (2nd overall) selection in the 2012 NFL Draft for the Redskin's first round (6th overall) and second round (39th overall) in the 2012 NFL Draft, the Redskin's first-round selection (22nd overall) in the 2013 NFL Draft, and the first-round selection (2nd overall) in the 2014 NFL Draft.
 The Rams traded their first-round (15th overall), two second-round (43rd and 45th overall), and third-round (76th overall) selections in the 2016 NFL Draft as well as their first- and third-round selections in the 2017 NFL Draft for the Titans' first-round (1st overall), fourth-round (113th overall), and sixth-round (177th overall) selections in the 2016 NFL Draft

References

Specific

General
 
 

Los Angeles Rams
First-round draft picks